Alfred Zachariewicz (26 August 1871 – 11 July 1937), was a Polish architect. He was born in Lemberg, Austria-Hungary on 26 August 1871, as the son of Juljan Oktawjan Zacharjewicz. He worked in the region of Galicia, mainly in Lviv, designing public and industrial buildings such as the edifices of Izba Handlowo-Przemysłowa, the Bank of Lviv, the Passage of Mikolasch in Lviv, as well as bridges, tenements, villas, goods stations (Lviv railway station).

He died in Warsaw on 11 July 1937.

References

External links
 

1871 births
1937 deaths
Architects from Lviv
People from the Kingdom of Galicia and Lodomeria
Polish Austro-Hungarians
Lviv Polytechnic alumni